Klemens is a masculine given name derived from Clemens. It may refer to the following people:

 Klemens of Brzeźnica (died 1241), Polish nobleman, Voivode of Opole and Castellan of Kraków
 Klemens Janicki (1516–1543), Polish poet
 Klemens von Metternich (1773–1859), Austrian Chancellor of State and diplomat
 Klemens Zamoyski (1747–1767), Polish nobleman

See also
 Klemen, a given name

German masculine given names
Polish masculine given names